Julia Campbell may refer to:

Julia Campbell (born 1963), American actress
Julia Campbell (journalist) (1967–2007), American journalist
Julia Campbell (footballer) (born 1965), New Zealand women's international football player

See also
Julie Campbell (disambiguation)
Juliet Campbell (disambiguation)